Joseph Grigsby Smyth (February 25, 1847 – June 8, 1915) was a Texan politician who served in the Texas House from 1870-1873.

Life

Early years (1847-1870)
Smyth was born on February 25, 1847, to George Washington Smyth Sr. and Frances Mitchell Grigsby. He was the youngest of 6 children born between 1836-1847.
He married Ella E. Green on March 2, 1868. They had 5 children together, but only 2 made it past 9. Ella died on September 13, 1883.

Texas House (1870-1873)
He was elected to the Texas House in February 1870 at the age of 22, about 2 weeks before his birthday.

Later years (1873-1915)
He married Epsie Belle Miller on June 5, 1884. They ended up having 8 children together between September 1885 and February 1901. One of them died before turning 2. Joseph later died June 8, 1915, at the age of 68.

References

1847 births
1915 deaths
19th-century American politicians